Quappi in Pink Jumper is an oil on canvas painting by German artist Max Beckmann, executed in 1932–1934. The painting is in the collections of the Thyssen-Bornemisza Museum in Madrid.

Description
Beckmann's characteristically harsh style began to soften noticeably since the mid-1920s, which coincided with his acquaintance and marriage to Matilda von Kaulbach, also known as Quappi, the artist's second wife.

The distinctive black outline, formerly of a bitter contempt for modern society, now sets off the beautiful features of his young wife. Quappi is depicted sitting in an armchair, wearing a pink kerchief, dressed in a pink jumper and a brown skirt, with her legs crossed, holding a cigarette in her right hand. Beckmann's quick brush turns the fashionable Quappi into the prototype of a modern woman, determined and confident. Begun in 1932, Beckmann finished this portrait in 1934, changing the date and making Quappi less smiling, for better reflect the couple's concerns about the Nazi rise to power.

References

1934 paintings
Paintings by Max Beckmann
Paintings in the Thyssen-Bornemisza Museum
Portraits of women